William Frischkorn (born June 10, 1981 in Charleston, West Virginia) is a former professional road bicycle racer, who finished his career with UCI ProTour team . He retired from professional cycling in September 2009 to take up a non-racing role with the team.

Major results

1998
 1st, US National Junior Championship (Road)
1999
 2nd, US National Junior Championship (Cyclo-cross)
2000
 3rd in Philadelphia
 3rd, Stage 1, Cascade Classic
 3rd, Stage 5, Cascade Classic
2003
 1st, Boulder-Roubaix
 2nd, Carter Lake Race
 3rd, U23 category, Tour of Flanders
 2nd, Tim Hortons Road National Championship
 3rd, US National U23 Championship (Road Time-trial)
 1st, Stage 3 and General Classification of the Tour de Delta
2004
 1st, Koppenberg USA (USA)
 3rd, Stage 4, Tour of Connecticut
 2nd, Castle Rock
 3rd, Stage 3, 2nd in General classification, Fitchburg Longsjo Classic
 3rd, Coal Miners
 1st, Stages 1 and 3, and in General Classification, Colorado Cyclist Classic
2005
 1st, Prologue, 2nd, Stages 4,5 and 7b, Tour de la Martinique
 3rd, US National Championship (Track, Elite Team Pursuit)
2006
 2nd, Stage 6, Tour de Beauce
 2nd, Stage 1, 2nd in General Classification, Bermuda GP
 1st, US National Championship (Track, Elite Team Pursuit)
2007
 1st, Stage 1a, 2nd in General Classification, Tour of the Bahamas
 1st, Univest Grand Prix
 2nd, General Classification, Tour of Missouri
2008
 2nd, Stage 3, Tour de France
  Combative rider, Stage 3, Tour de France

References

External links
 VELOBIOS profile
 Charleston Gazette, July 8 2008

1981 births
Living people
American male cyclists